Vaprio may refer to:

People:
Agustino Da Vaprio, Italian Renaissance painter
Constantino Vaprio, Italian Renaissance painter
Paola Vaprio (born 1986), Panamanian beauty pageant winner

Places:
 Vaprio d'Adda, province of Milan, Lombardy, Italy
 Vaprio d'Agogna, province of Novara, Piedmont, Italy
 Casaletto Vaprio, province of Cremona, Lombardy, Italy